Uptown Records is a jazz record label based in Champlain, New York. It was founded by Robert E. Sunenblick MD. (Bob Sunenblick) in 1981. Former seat has been in Harrington Park, New Jersey.

Discography

External links

References

Jazz record labels